John Leveque (born March 12, 1944) is a sound editor. He has won two BAFTAs for sound and has been nominated by the Motion Picture Sound Editors for sound.

He has worked on over 70 films.

Oscar history
All four nominations are for Best Sound Editing.

 65th Academy Awards - nominated for Under Siege. Nomination shared with Bruce Stambler. Lost to Bram Stoker's Dracula.
 66th Academy Awards - nominated for The Fugitive. Nomination shared with Bruce Stambler. Lost to Jurassic Park.
 67th Academy Awards - nominated for Clear and Present Danger. Nomination shared with Bruce Stambler. Lost to Speed.
 68th Academy Awards - nominated for Batman Forever. Nomination shared with Bruce Stambler. Lost to Braveheart.

References

External links

Sound editors
Living people
Best Sound BAFTA Award winners
Place of birth missing (living people)
1944 births